George Joseph (5 June 1887 – 5 March 1938) was a lawyer and Indian independence activist. One of the earliest and among the most prominent Syrian Christians from Kerala to join the freedom struggle, Joseph's working life in Madurai and is remembered for his role in the Home Rule agitation and the Vaikom Satyagraha and for his editorship of Motilal Nehru's The Independent and Mahatma Gandhi's Young India.

Early life and education 
George Joseph was born the eldest child of CI Joseph at Chengannur, a town in the Travancore State and now a part of the Indian state of Kerala. His younger brother, Pothan Joseph, became a famous journalist and editor of several newspapers. George studied at the Madras Christian College and did M.A. in philosophy at the University of Edinburgh before doing law at the Middle Temple, London in 1908. During his time in London he came into contact with many prominent Indian freedom fighters there. Having completed his studies, he returned to India in January 1909.

Role in the freedom struggle 
On Joseph's return from London, he initially set up practice at Madras before shifting to Madurai. He hosted at his house in Madurai several leaders of the freedom struggle including Gandhi, C. Rajagopalachari, Srinivasa Iyengar and K. Kamaraj during their visits there. Subramania Bharati composed the Viduthalai, a well known patriotic song while staying at Joseph's residence.

Home Rule and Non Cooperation Movements 
In 1917, aged 29, Joseph was invited by Annie Besant to go to England along with her, Syed Hussain and BV Narasimhan to talk about Home Rule there. The British however foiled this bid, arresting them when the ship Besant had chartered reached Gibraltar, Subsequently, deporting them back to India. When P. Varadarajulu Naidu was arrested for making a speech at the Victoria Edward Hall, George Joseph assisted C. Rajagopalachari who appeared for Naidu in the case. Joseph was the leader of the Rowlatt Satyagraha in Madurai, organising meetings, fasts and hartals during the satyagraha and during the Non-Cooperation Movement he relinquished his lucrative legal practice and joined the movement.

Trade unionist and editor 
Joseph played an important role in setting up the trade union movement in Madurai to organise the textile mill workers there. The union's initial struggles resulted in higher wages and reduced work hours for the mill workers but soon the mill owners and the government came together to bring about a collapse of the union. Joseph edited the Nehrus' Allahabad based newspaper The Independent during 1920-21 until his arrest on charges of sedition and the subsequent closure of the paper. He also succeeded Rajagopalachari to the editorship of Gandhi's Young India in 1923.

Vaikom Satyagraha 
Joseph was an eager participant in the Vaikom Satyagraha that sought to achieve the right to temple entry for the Dalits in Travancore. According to C. F. Andrews, the plan for a non violent agitation was arrived upon by Joseph when he visited Gandhi who was convalescing in Bombay. Joseph and other Congressmen led the Dalits in walking through the Brahmin quarter of the town where they were met with violence. The police immediately arrested Joseph and his accomplices who were sentenced to varying terms in prison. Joseph viewed the struggle at Vaikom an issue of civil rights for all Indian citizens but this was in contrast to the views of most Congressmen who saw it as purely an issue between high and low caste Hindus and to be settled by the Hindus themselves. Gandhi himself did not encourage Joseph's participation in the satyagraha. Disillusioned by Gandhi's lack of support and the attitude of the Congress Party, Joseph left the Congress Party to join the Justice Party. He however rejoined the Congress in 1935.

Rosapoo Durai 
Joseph led Congressmen of Madurai in the agitation against the Simon Commission. In this he was supported by K Kamaraj and the duo mobilised thousands of volunteers at the Tirumalai Nayak Mahal to demonstrate against the Commission when it visited Madurai in 1929. Later, when Kamaraj was implicated in Virudhunagar Conspiracy Case in 1933, Joseph and Varadarajulu Naidu argued on his behalf and succeeded in exonerating him of all charges. He also agitated against the Criminal Tribes Act (CTA), an act that criminalised and negatively affected communities like the Piramalai kallar and Maravars. He fought for them in the courts and wrote extensively in the newspapers against the act and came to be called Rosapoo Durai by the grateful Kallars who continue to pay homage to him on his death anniversary.

Parliamentary career 
In 1929 Joseph contested the municipal elections in Madurai on a Congress ticket but lost. In July 1937, he was elected to the Central Legislative Assembly from Madura-cum-Ramnad-Tirunelveli constituency.

Death and commemoration 
Following a prolonged period of illness, Joseph died at the American Mission Hospital in Madurai on 5 March 1938. He was 50. He is buried at the East Gate Cemetery in Madurai. George Joseph: The Life and Times of a Christian Nationalist is his biography by his grandson George Gheverghese Joseph.

References

Other sources

External links  
 Family Website of George Joseph

1887 births
Indian independence activists from Kerala
Indian National Congress politicians from Kerala
1938 deaths
Indian editors
Trade unionists from Kerala
People from Alappuzha district
Indian male journalists
20th-century Indian journalists
Journalists from Kerala
Gandhians
20th-century Indian educational theorists
Christian nationalists